The Magnificent is an epithet applied to:

People
Amenhotep III (died 1531 or 1533 BC), Pharaoh of Egypt
Edmund I (922–946), King of England
Isma'il Pasha (1830–1895), Khedive of Egypt and Sudan
Joasaph II of Constantinople, Ecumenical Patriarch of Constantinople from 1556 to 1565
Leo I, King of Armenia (1150–1219), also known as Levon I the Magnificent
Lorenzo de' Medici (1449–1492), Italian statesman and de facto ruler of the Florentine Republic
Robert I, Duke of Normandy (1000–1035), father of William the Conqueror
Simão Gonçalves da Câmara (1463–1530), Portuguese governor of the captaincy of Funchal
Suleiman the Magnificent (1494–1566), Sultan of the Ottoman Empire

Fictional characters
Carnac the Magnificent, a recurring character played by late-night television host Johnny Carson
Mongo the Magnificent, a private eye and criminologist in several books by George C. Chesbro
Morgus the Magnificent, a "horror host" of late-night science fiction and horror movies
Peter Pevensie, in the Chronicles of Narnia fantasy series

See also
Pierre Bernard (yogi) (1875–1955), "Oom the Magnificent", American yogi, scholar, occultist, philosopher, mystic and businessman
The Magnificent Muraco, a ring name of professional wrestler Don Muraco (born 1949)
Mario Lemieux (born 1965), "The Magnificent One", "Le Magnifique", professional ice hockey player

Lists of people by epithet